This is a list of Olympic records in track cycling.

Men's records
♦ denotes a performance that is also a current world record.  Statistics are correct as of 4 August 2021.

Women's records
♦ denotes a performance that is also a current world record.  Statistics are correct as of 6 August 2021.

* In 2016, the 3000 m team pursuit with 3 riders will be replaced by a 4000 m team pursuit with 4 person riders.

References

Cycling
Track cycling at the Summer Olympics
Track cycling records
Olympic Games